The following is the final results of the 1990 World Wrestling Championships. The Men's Freestyle Competition was held in Tokyo, Japan. Men's Greco-Roman Competition was held in Ostia, Rome, Italy and Women's Competition was held in Luleå, Sweden. Despite the German reunification coming effective as of 3 October 1990, West and East Germany still had separate teams in the Greco-Roman championships.

Medal table

Team ranking

Medal summary

Men's freestyle

Men's Greco-Roman

Women's freestyle

References
UWW Database

World Wrestling Championships
W
W
W
W
W
W
W